Chondrolepis obscurior is a species of butterfly in the family Hesperiidae. It is found in Tanzania from the Southern Highlands to Mufindi.

References

Endemic fauna of Tanzania
Butterflies described in 1986
Hesperiinae